Richard Bristow (1538 at Worcester – 1581 at Harrow on the Hill) was an English Catholic controversialist and Biblical scholar.

Life 
Richard Bristow was born in 1538 in Worcester, England.

At the Age of 17, he went to the University of Oxford, disputedly as a member of Exeter College. In 1559, he took his Bachelor's degree. After that, he attained an MA from Christ Church, Oxford, in 1562. In 1566, he and Edmund Campion were chosen to hold a public disputation before Queen Elizabeth I of England.

Shortly afterward, having applied himself to theology and acquired a wide reputation, he was made a Fellow of Exeter College (1567) by the interest of Sir William Petre, who had founded several fellowships there. His ability would have won further promotion for him had his religious opinions not undergone a change, an indication of which was given in his argument with the Regius Professor of Divinity, whom he confused.

Two years after his appointment to the fellowship, he left Oxford for Leuven, where he met William Allen. Allen secured him for his new college at Douai and appointed him its first prefect of studies. He was Allen's "right hand upon all occasions", acting as rector when he was absent and when the college moved in 1578 to Reims.

Bristow is well known, however, as an earnest student, a powerful controversial writer and, with Allen, as one of the revisers of the Douay Bible. His labours told upon a constitution that was naturally weak, and he was obliged to relinquish his work in 1581.

In May of the same year he went to Spa, Belgium but, gaining no advantage after two months, he was advised to return to England. He returned in September, staying until his death. He was accompanied by Jerome Bellamy, a Catholic of means.

Richard Bristow died at the early age of 43 on 18 October 1581.

Writings
A Briefe Treatise of diuerse and sure wayes to finde out the truthe in this doubtful and dangerous time of Heresie: conteyning sundry worthy Motives to the Catholic faith, or considerations to moue a man to beleue the Catholikes and not the Heretikes (Third edition entitled Motives inducing to the Catholike Faith.)
Tabula in Summam Theologicam S. Thomae Aquinatis
A Reply to Will. Fulke
Demandes to be proponed of Catholikes to the Heretikes
A Defence of the Bull of Pope Pius V
Annotations on the Rheims translation of the New Testament
Carmina Diversa
Motiva Omnibus Catholicae Doctrinae Orthodoxis Cultoribus pernecessaria 
(The last two being left in manuscript.)

External References

Thomas Worthington, Compendium Vitae Auctoris (prefixed to Motiva)
Records of the English Catholics, I, II
Charles Dodd, Church History of England, ed. Tierney (London, 1843)
Joseph Gillow, Bibl. Dict. Eng. Cath.
Anthony Wood, Athenae Oxonienses
John Pitts, De Angliae Scriptoribus

External links

Attribution

1538 births
1581 deaths
Writers from Worcester, England
English religious writers
English Roman Catholics
16th-century English writers
16th-century male writers
16th-century Roman Catholics